Edvard Eilert Christie (10 August 1773 – 14 August 1831) was a Norwegian businessperson and politician.

He was a son of postmaster and merchant in Christianssund, Johann Koren Christie (1745–1823). He was a nephew of Werner Hosewinckel Christie and a brother of noted politician Wilhelm Frimann Koren Christie. He was the father of writer Johan Koren Christie, and also an uncle of physicist Hartvig Caspar Christie, politician Hans Langsted Christie and architect Christian Christie, and a granduncle of agricultural teacher Werner Hosewinckel Christie.

Edvard Eilert Christie is best known for serving one term in the Parliament of Norway, being elected in 1824 from the constituency Christianssund og Molde. He was a merchant there, and also a customs officer. He died in 1831.

References

1773 births
1831 deaths
Norwegian businesspeople
Members of the Storting
Møre og Romsdal politicians
Politicians from Kristiansund
Norwegian people of Scottish descent